Back to Time (Complete EMI Years) is a compilation album by Greek singer Anna Vissi, including the whole recordings which are now back catalogue items of Minos EMI. It is part of Minos EMI's special edition "EMI Years" compilations of early recordings by artists which were either signed to them directly or of releases which have since become part of their back catalogue.

The recordings include most of her recordings under her signings with Minos (1974–1978), a company which was bought out by EMI to form Minos EMI in the 1990s, and Columbia EMI Greece (1978–1982).

Track listing

Disc 1
 "Oso Eho Foni (Revival Mix)" (As long as I have a voice (Revival Mix))
 "Aftos Pou Perimeno" (He who wait (Anna's Dream Mix))
 "Kalimera Kenouria Mou Agapi" (Good morning my new love)
 "Poso S' Agapo" (How much I love you)
 "Horis Esena Ego Den Kano" (I don't do without you)
 "Thelo Mono Esena" (I only want you)
 "Tha Borousa" (I could)
 "Einai Stigmes" (There are moments)
 "Ta Matia Ta Dika Mou" (The eyes of my own)
 "Den Eimai Monahi (Where Are You Going?)" (I'm not alone)
 "Oso Eho Foni (Album Version)" (As long as I have a voice)
 "Aftos Pou Perimeno (Album Version)" (He who wait)
 "Mi Stenahoriese Ki Ehi O Theos" (Don't worry and have a God)
 "Kitrino Galazio Ke Menexedi" (Yellow, blue and lilac)
 "Methismeni Politia" (Drunk state)
 "Autostop" (Anna Vissi & Epikouri)" (Hitchhiking)
 "Aftos Pou Perimeno (Dream In The House Mix)" (He who wait (Dream In The House Mix))
 "Oso Eho Foni (Club Mix)" (As long as I have a voice (Club Mix))

Disc 2
 "Mono I Agapi (Love Is A Lonely Weekend)" (Only love)
 "To Xero Tha 'rthis Xana (Woman In Love)" (I know you'll come again)
 "Ma Itan Psemata (:it:Un pò di più)" (But it was a lie)
 "Hanome" (I get lost)
 "Xehase Me (La Bohème)" (Forget me)
 "Se Lipame" (I feel sorry for you)
 "Kles Esi Kai Pono (Je reviens te chercher)" (You cry and I feel pain)
 "Ma De Fovame" (But I'm not afraid)
 "Milise Mou" (Talk to me)
 "Vres Ton Tropo" (Find a way)
 "Agapi Mou" (My love)
 "An Toulahiston" (If at least)
 "M' Agapas" (You love me)
 "Krivame Tin Agapi Mas" (We hide our love)
 "S' Agapo" (I love you)
 "Dipsasa Stin Porta Sou" (I'm thirsty at your door)
 "Yia Tin Agapi Pes Mou" (Tell me about love)
 "Paramithi Xehasmeno" (Forgotten fairytale)

Disc 3
 "Ela Na Zisoume" (Come to live)
 "Xanazo" (I live again)
 "Yi Afto Sou Leo Mi" (That's why I tell you no)
 "Ti Me Rotas" (What are you asking me?)
 "Na I Zoi" (To life)
 "M' Agapouses Kapou Kapou" (Sometimes you loved me)
 "Kegete O Kosmos, Kegete" (The world is burned, burned)
 "Ti Ta Thelis Lipon" (So what do you want?)
 "Diskolos Keros" (Difficult time)
 "Ki Esi Milas" (And you speak)
 "Tote Tha Figo" (Then I'll leave)
 "Yiati Gelas" (Why are you laughing?)
 "Oute Ena S' Agapo" (Not even one "I love you")
 "San Ta Pinasmena Peristeria" (Like hungry pigeons)
 "O, Maria" (Oh! Maria)
 "O Kirios Nobel" (Mr. Nobel)
 "Nikisame" (We won)
 "To Etos Tou Pediou" (The year of the child)

Disc 4
 "As Kanoume Apopse Mia Arhi" (Let's make a start tonight)
 "Agapise Me" (Love me)
 "Na 'mouna Sta Heria Sou Karavi" (I was in the hands of your boat)
 "I Kiklades" (The Cyclades)
 "I Nikimeni Imaste Emis" (We are the losers)
 "Mi Vazis Mavro" (Don't put black)
 "Kladi Rodias" (Branch of pomegranate)
 "Apo 'do Ki Apo 'ki" (From here and from there)
 "Sou 'dosa Na Piis" (I gave you to drink)
 "Gia Sas Triadafilla" (Hello roses)
 "I Agapi Sou Sholio" (Your school love)
 "To Tali-bo"
 "Ilie Mou" (My sun)
 "To Palio T' Aeroplano" (The old plane)
 "Savvatiatika" (On a Saturday)
 "To Palikari" (The stalwart)
 "Mia Mikri Psihoula" (A little soul)
 "Thelo" (I want)
 "Krasi, Thalassa Kai T' Agori Mou" (Wine, sea and my boyfriend)
 "Ego Eimai Ego" (It's me, me)

Credits and personnel

Personnel
Charles Aznavour - music
Sergio Bardotti - music
Gilbert François Becaud - music
Akos Daskalopoulos (alias: M. Korfiatis) - lyrics 
P. Delanoe - music 
Daniel Deschenes - music 
Manos Eleftheriou - lyrics 
Panos Falaras - lyrics 
Doros Georgiadis - music, lyrics, vocals 
G. Gerasimidis - music, lyrics 
Barry Gibbs - music 
Robin Gibbs - music
Christos Gkartzos - music 
Giorgos Hadjinasios - music 
Dimitris Iatropoulos - lyrics 
Ioannis Kalamitsis - lyrics 
Giorgos Kanellopoulos - lyrics
Tasos Karakatsanis - music 
Giorgos Katsaros - music 
Nikos Karvelas (alias: Nikos Leonardos) - music, lyrics 
Stavros Kougioumtzis - music, lyrics  
Charles Pierre Leroyer - music
K. Loïzos - music 
Αlice Maywood - music
Kostis Palamas - lyrics 
Polydoros - lyrics 

Manolis Mikelis - music 
Dimos Moutsis- music 
Takis Mpougas - music
Philippos Nikolaou - music, lyrics 
Spiros Papavasiliou- music 
Yiannis Parios - lyrics 
Jacques Plante - music 
Pythagoras - lyrics 
Marianna Sakari - music, lyrics 
Norman David Shapiro - music 
Yiannis Spanos - music 
Lakis Teäzis - lyrics 
Barbara Tsimboulis - lyrics 
Sotia Tsotou - lyrics
Giorgos Tzavaras - music
Nikos Tzavaras - music 
Antonis Vardis - music, guitars
Anna Vissi - vocals, music, lyrics 
Spiros Vlassopoulos - music

Production
Giorgos Tsambras - compilation, introductory note 
Christos Hadjistamou - digital remastering at Athens Mastering Studio

Design
Petros Paraschis - cover design, artwork

Chart performance
When the collection was released in October 2007, it peaked at position 34. 5 years later, in October 2012 it was re-released in a new box, with a cheaper price and the album re-entered the Greek charts with a new peak at number 8 (week 43 of the year 2012). The following week the album moved up a position, creating a new peak, at number 7.

References

2007 compilation albums
Greek-language albums
Anna Vissi compilation albums
Minos EMI compilation albums